Yosuke Muraki-Iwata (born 19 January 1960) is a Japanese weightlifter. He competed at the 1984 Summer Olympics, the 1988 Summer Olympics and the 1992 Summer Olympics.

References

1960 births
Living people
Japanese male weightlifters
Olympic weightlifters of Japan
Weightlifters at the 1984 Summer Olympics
Weightlifters at the 1988 Summer Olympics
Weightlifters at the 1992 Summer Olympics
Sportspeople from Okayama Prefecture
Asian Games medalists in weightlifting
Weightlifters at the 1986 Asian Games
Asian Games silver medalists for Japan
Medalists at the 1986 Asian Games
20th-century Japanese people
21st-century Japanese people